Gbadebo Rhodes-Vivour, also known as GRV, (born 8 March 1983) is a Nigerian architect, activist and politician. He is the gubernatorial candidate of the Labour Party for Lagos State in the upcoming 2023 gubernatorial election. He was the senatorial candidate of the Peoples Democratic Party for the Lagos West senatorial district in the 2019 Senate elections.

Background and education 
Rhodes-Vivour was born on Lagos Island. He grew up in Ikeja.

He attended Chrisland primary and secondary schools up to JSS3, and then proceeded to Paris to attend École Active Bilingue, where he completed his secondary education. He has a bachelor's degree in architecture from University of Nottingham and a master's degree in the same field from the Massachusetts Institute of Technology (MIT). He partook in the National Youth Service Corps (NYSC) in 2008 after his first master's and completed it in 2009. He later attained a second master's degree in Research and Public Policy; from the University of Lagos (UNILAG).

Rhodes-Vivour is from a family of lawyers. He is the son of Barrister Olawale and Mrs. Nkechi Rhodes-Vivour. A former justice of the Supreme Court of Nigeria, Bode Rhodes-Vivour, is his uncle, while the late Judge Akinwunmi Rhodes-Vivour is his grandfather. He is the great-grandson of Steven Bankole Rhodes; the second ever indigenous judge appointed in Nigeria.

Activism 
Rhodes-Vivour is the convener of the civil society group, Nigerians Against GMO, an Anti-GMO advocacy group fighting against the proliferation of Genetically Modified Foods in Nigeria. Their protest increased in 2016, following claims by Monsanto that GMOs are safe, tackling the Nigerian Minister of Agriculture, Akinwumi Adesina, as well as the multinational company.

In 2017, he alongside Nnimmo Bassey, led a 2,000-man march to the Senate to lend a voice in the fight against environmental degradation. He also campaigns for the inclusion of history as a subject in Nigerian school curriculum.

In 2022, Rhodes-Vivour collaborated with WellaHealth to provide free health checks and insurance for 1 million people in Lagos who have their Voter's card, in commemoration of World Malaria Day and to encourage people to get their Voter's card to enable them vote in upcoming elections.

Career 
He worked with Franklin Ellis Architects when he was in the UK. On returning to Nigeria, he worked with SISA, Cliff Consulting now called Building Partnership CCP and Patrick Wayi, before venturing fully into politics.

Political career 
He was one of the first beneficiaries of the Not Too Young To Run legislation. In 2017, Rhodes-Vivour contested the Ikeja Local Government Area chairmanship under the KOWA party. Citing that the absence of godfatherism in the party made him contest under the platform. He lost to the candidate of the incumbent APC.

In 2019, he contested for the senate seat to represent Lagos west under the PDP. His campaign points were to revamp the infrastructure within the district and well as to get out the incumbent who he term as an "absentee senator spending more resources pursuing a futile governorship bid in Ogun State, rather than focus on Lagos West that have already given him their mandate". He came second in the final polls, losing to the incumbent senator and contestant under the erstwhile ruling party APC, Solomon Olamilekan Adeola 'Yayi', by 243,516 votes to Adeola's 323,817. Adeola received 41.38% of the votes, while Rhodes-Vivour received 39.40%. He contested the result in court, citing electoral violence and disruptions as reasons why the result should not be valid. However, the court deemed that not to be enough and upheld the election of his opponent.

He is the Labour party gubernatorial candidate for the upcoming 2023 Lagos State gubernatorial election. He was initially one of the nominees gearing up to contest under the PDP, but pulled out just before the primary election was held.
 He cross carpeted to the Labour party, contesting during substitute election through which the substantive candidate of the party was to be chosen, and came out victorious, getting 111 votes, to defeat former All Progressives Congress (APC) chieftain Moshood Salvador, who got 102 votes.

Personal life 

He is married to Dr. Ify Rhodes-Vivour (née Aniebo), a molecular geneticist by profession, who is the daughter of former military administrator to Kogi and Borno states, Augustine Aniebo.

References 

Nigerian politicians
Lagos State
Living people
1983 births
Yoruba people
People from Lagos State
University of Lagos alumni